Tugimaantee 13 (ofcl. abbr. T13), also called the Jägala–Käravete highway, is a 52.7-kilometre-long national basic road in northern Estonia. The highway begins at Jägala on national road 1 and ends at Käravete on national road 5.

Route
T13 passes through the following counties and municipalities:
Harju County
Jõelähtme Parish
Anija Parish
Lääne-Viru County
Tapa Parish
Järva County
Järva Parish

See also
 Transport in Estonia

References

External links

N13